The Night Undoes The Work Of The Day is the sixth Oh My God studio album, and the second to be released by Split Red Records.

Track listing
 My Own Adventure - 3:39
 My Prayer - 3:15
 Bring Yourself - 3:22
 Baby There's Nothin' Wrong (You Just Gotta Go To Work) - 2:17
 I Don't Think It's Funny (How Time Slips Away) - 4:20
 One Thing Leads To Another - 2:52
 Baby, Dream - 3:45
 My Juliet - 3:33
 I Dare You To Love Me - 2:44
 Strangers On A Train - 6:19

2009 albums
Oh My God (band) albums